The 2010 Grand Prix Cycliste de Montréal was the first edition of the Grand Prix Cycliste de Montréal, one-day professional bicycle road race held in Montreal, Quebec, Canada. It was held on September 12, 2010, as the final event in the 2010 UCI ProTour.  With the Grand Prix Cycliste de Québec held two days earlier on September 10, 2010, the 2010 edition was the last of only two stops in North America for the 2010 UCI ProTour.
It is part of the UCI World Ranking.

Course
The course consists of three climbs each circuit and is well-suited for climbers. The climbs consist of:
 KM 2: Côte Camilien-Houde 1.8 km, 8% average grade
 KM 6: Côte de la Polytechnique 780 m, 6% average grade, including a 200 m climb at 11%
 KM 11: Avenue du Parc 560 m, 4% average grade

Note: The last climb crosses through the finish line

Teams
Twenty One teams were invited to the 2010 Grand Prix Cycliste de Montréal.

Teams from the UCI Pro Tour

Teams awarded a wildcard invitation

Results

References

2010
Grand Prix Cycliste de Montreal
Grand Prix Cycliste de Montreal
Grand Prix Cycliste de Montreal
2010 in Quebec